Lulabox were a London-based three-piece shoegaze band, active from 1993 to 1994. The band, who were signed to Radioactive Records consisted of Mary Cassidy (vocals), Michael Cozzi (guitar) and Stephen Ferrara (drums, bass, keyboards, percussion, programming). Recorded and Mixed by Kevin Killen.

Discography

Studio albums
Lulabox CD (1993, Radioactive Records)

Singles and EPs
"Full Bleed EP" CD / Maxi / 12" (1992, Radioactive)
"Choked" CD / Maxi / 12" (1993, Radioactive)
"Prayer For Rain" CD / 12" (1993, Radioactive)
"I Believe" CD / 12" (1993, Radioactive)
"Ride On" 12" (1993, Radioactive)

References

External links
Lulabox on YouTube

Musical groups established in 1993
Musical groups disestablished in 1994
British shoegaze musical groups
1993 establishments in England